Defending champion Esther Vergeer defeated Aniek van Koot in the final, 6–0, 6–0 to win the women's singles wheelchair tennis title at the 2012 Australian Open. She lost no sets and just four games en route to the title.

The 2012 Australian Open – Wheelchair women's singles was a tennis tournament featuring 8 paraplegic women tennis players, and part of the NEC Tour. The tournament took place at Melbourne Park in Melbourne, Australia, from 25 January to 28 January 2012, as the 10th edition of the Australian Open women's wheelchair event and the first Grand Slam event of 2012. The tournament was played on Plexicushion Prestige AO hard courts, which was rated a medium-fast pace by the ITF. The competition was organised by the International Tennis Federation and Tennis Australia.

Seeds
  Esther Vergeer (champion)
  Aniek van Koot (final)

Draw

Finals

References
 Main Draw

Wheelchair Women's Singles
2012 Women's Singles